Amor is a name from Latin , meaning 'love'.

Notable people with the name include:

First name 
Amor De Cosmos (1825–1897), Canadian journalist, publisher and politician
Amor Deloso, Filipino politician
Amor Kehiha (born 1977), French-Algerian footballer
Amor Mašović (born 1955), Bosnian politician

Surname 
Bill Amor (1919–1988), English amateur footballer
Emiliano Amor (born 1995), Argentine footballer
Gemma Amor, British writer
Guillermo Amor (born 1967), Spanish footballer
Kyle Amor (born 1987), English rugby league player
Kyle Alandy Amor, American visual artist, model, singer and actor
Pita Amor (1918–2000), Mexican poet
Rick Amor (born 1948), Australian painter
Shaul Amor (1940–2004), Israeli politician
Simon Amor (born 1979), English rugby union player